Jagannath Temple (Devnagari: जगन्नाथ मन्दिर) is a Hindu temple dedicated to Lord Vishnu and located in Alwar, India. The temple's presiding deity is anthropomorphic form of Lord Jagannath of Puri, while other two deities are SitaramJi, the Shaligram maharaj and JankiJi, the goddess Laxmi. The temple is built several meters above the ground in old part of the city. It has awe inspiring medieval architecture and rare floral motifs adorn its walls and pillars. The Garbhagriha has two deities of Lord Jagannath, one is movable while other is fixed. It is probably the only temple where two deities of one presiding Lord reside simultaneously. The temple is famous for its annual Rath Yatra festival where Lord Jagannath is carried in a chariot called Indra Vimana. The chariot, earlier an elephant carriage, had been used by erstwhile Maharaja of Alwar and was donated to the temple later on to be used for the Rath yatra. The Rath Yatra festival follows different traditions and rituals than those of Puri. Here, it is part of annual wedding celebration between Lord Jagannath and JankiJi at Roopbas. The fixed deity of Lord Jagannath, Budhe Jagannath, is much older and available for darshana only for five days during Rath Yatra.

Gallery

References

Tourist attractions in Alwar district
Hindu temples in Rajasthan
Temples dedicated to Jagannath
Tourist attractions in Alwar